Heiko Balz (born 17 September 1969) is a German Freestyle wrestler. He won a silver medal at the 1992 Summer Olympics.

References

External links
 

1969 births
Living people
People from Burg bei Magdeburg
German male sport wrestlers
Olympic wrestlers of Germany
Wrestlers at the 1992 Summer Olympics
Wrestlers at the 1996 Summer Olympics
Olympic silver medalists for Germany
Olympic medalists in wrestling
Medalists at the 1992 Summer Olympics
European Wrestling Championships medalists
World Wrestling Championships medalists
Sportspeople from Saxony-Anhalt